

194001–194100 

|-bgcolor=#f2f2f2
| colspan=4 align=center | 
|}

194101–194200 

|-bgcolor=#f2f2f2
| colspan=4 align=center | 
|}

194201–194300 

|-id=262
| 194262 Nové Zámky ||  || Nové Zámky, a modern town and district center in southern Slovakia || 
|}

194301–194400 

|-bgcolor=#f2f2f2
| colspan=4 align=center | 
|}

194401–194500 

|-bgcolor=#f2f2f2
| colspan=4 align=center | 
|}

194501–194600 

|-bgcolor=#f2f2f2
| colspan=4 align=center | 
|}

194601–194700 

|-bgcolor=#f2f2f2
| colspan=4 align=center | 
|}

194701–194800 

|-bgcolor=#f2f2f2
| colspan=4 align=center | 
|}

194801–194900 

|-bgcolor=#f2f2f2
| colspan=4 align=center | 
|}

194901–195000 

|-id=970
| 194970 Márai || 2002 BH || Sándor Márai (1900–1989), a Hungarian writer and journalist || 
|-id=982
| 194982 Furia || 2002 BH ||  (1929–2010), an Italian meteorologists, amateur astronomer and naturalist who founded the Schiaparelli Astronomical Society || 
|}

References 

194001-195000